Rams is a documentary film about German industrial designer Dieter Rams, directed by Gary Hustwit.

Hustwit ran a successful Kickstarter campaign in 2016 to raise initial funding for the film. The film examines Rams' influence on modern design, his work for Braun and Vitsœ, and his philosophies on sustainability and consumerism.

The film was announced in June 2016, and was released in the Fall 2018.

English musician Brian Eno composed the film's music. A soundtrack album of the score, Rams: Original Soundtrack, was to be released on 18 April 2020 to commemorate Record Store Day, until the event was postponed.

References

External links
 
 

American documentary films
2018 films
2018 documentary films
Films directed by Gary Hustwit
Industrial design
Documentary films about the visual arts
Crowdfunded films
Kickstarter-funded documentaries
2010s American films